Golet may refer to:
Goleț, a river in Romania
 Goleț, a village in Bucoșnița Commune, Caraș-Severin County, Romania 
Golleti, a village in Telgana, India
Golett, a Pokémon species